The Boston mayoral election of 1967 occurred on Tuesday, November 7, 1967, between Secretary of the Commonwealth Kevin White and Boston School Committee member Louise Day Hicks. White was elected to his first term, and inaugurated on Monday, January 1, 1968.

The nonpartisan municipal preliminary election was held on Tuesday, September 26, 1967.

Hicks' victory in the preliminary election made her the first woman to be a finalist for mayor in city history.

Candidates
Louise Day Hicks, member of the Boston School Committee since 1961.
Kevin White, Massachusetts Secretary of the Commonwealth since 1961.

Candidates eliminated in preliminary
Nicholas Abraham, West Roxbury businessman.
Stephen Davenport, member of the Massachusetts Senate since 1965, member of the Massachusetts House of Representatives from 1961 to 1965.
Peter F. Hines, member of the Boston City Council since 1958, council president in 1963.
Christopher A. Iannella, member of the Boston City Council since 1958, council president in 1962.
Edward J. Logue, former Director of the Boston Redevelopment Authority.
John J. McDonough, member of the Boston School Committee.
Albert L. O'Neil, member of the Boston Licensing Board.
John W. Sears, member of the Massachusetts House of Representatives since 1965.

Dropped out
Barry T. Hynes, President of the Boston City Council
Charles Iannello, state representative

Results

See also
List of mayors of Boston, Massachusetts

References

Further reading
  (candidate profiles)

Boston mayoral
Boston
Mayoral elections in Boston
Non-partisan elections
1960s in Boston